Gozuiyeh-ye Sofla (also Romanized as Gozū’īyeh-ye Soflá) is a village in Javaran Rural District, Hanza District, Rabor County, Kerman Province, Iran. At the 2006 census, its population was 42, in 10 families.

References 

Populated places in Rabor County